This is list of former German colonies owned by states of Germany:

Holy Roman Empire & German Confederation

Brandenburg-Prussia
Groß Friedrichsburg (in Ghana), 1683–1718 
Arguin (in Mauritania), 1685–1721 
Whydah (in present Bénin), c. 1700 (this Brandenburg 'colony' was just a minor point of support, a few dwellings at a site co-inhabited by British and Dutch)
Saint Thomas.  Leased by Brandenburg from the Danish West India Company, 1685–1720.   
Island of Crabs (Krabbeninsel in German) (Caribbean, now US), Brandenburg annexation in the Danish West Indies, 1689–1693
Tertholen (Caribbean), Occupied in 1696

Duchy of Courland

"New Courland", (1637, 1642, 1654–1659, 1680–1690)
Courlander Gambia
Fort Bayona, 1651-1660
Fort Jacob, 1651-1660
Fort Jillifree, 1651-1660

Free City of Augsburg

 Klein-Venedig,1528–1545

County of Hanau
 Hanauish-Indies, Planned in 1669 but later canceled in 1672

House of Ascania

Neu-Askania, 1828-1856

Habsburg Mornachy 
  
 

These were colonies of the Habsburg monarchy, part of the Holy Roman Empire of German Nation realm until 1804, German Confederation from 1815 to 1848 and from 1850 to 1866.
 Banquibazar, 1719-1723
 Cabelon, 1744-1750
Delagoa Bay, 1777-1781
 Nicobar islands, 1778–1783

German Empire

Africa 

The following were German African protectorates:

German South West Africa, 1884 to 1915
German West Africa, 1884 to 1915
Togoland, 1884 to 1916
Kamerun, from 1884 to 1916 
Kapitaï and Koba, 1884 to 1885
Mahinland, March 11, 1885 to October 24, 1885
German East Africa, 1885 to 1918
Witu Protectorate, 1885 to 1890
German Somali Coast, 1885 to 1888
German Congo, 1884 to 1885 
German Katanga, 1886
Gando Protectorate, 1895 to 1897
Gulmu Protectorate, 1895 to 1897
German South Africa, 1884 to 1885

Pacific 

These were German colonies established in the Pacific:
German New Guinea, 1884 to 1919
Kaiser-Wilhelmsland, 1885 to 1914
Bismarck Archipelago, 1885 to 1914
 German Solomon Islands Protectorate, 1885 to 1914
Bougainville Island, 1885 to 1914
Buka Island, 1885 to 1914
Choiseul Island, 1885  to 1900
Shortland Islands, 1885 to 1900
Santa Isabel Island, 1885 to 1900
Nauru, 1888 to 1914
Northern Mariana Islands, 1899 to 1914
Caroline Islands, 1899 to 1914
Palau Islands, 1899 to 1914
Marshall Islands, 1885 to 1914 
German Samoa, 1900 to 1914

China 
These Treaty ports were German concessions in China, leased to it by the Qing Dynasty:

 Kiautschou Bay concession, 1898 to 1914
 German concession in Tientsin, 1895 to 1917
  German concession in Hankou, 1895 to 1917
 Chefoo, 1901 to 1914

Nazi Germany
 Netherlands, 1940 to 1945
 Norway, 1940 to 1945
 Belgium and Northern France, 1944
 Ukraine, 1940 to 1944
 Ostland, 1941 to 1945

See also 
 German colonization of the Americas
 German colonial projects before 1871
 Klein-Venedig 
 Heligoland-Zanzibar Treaty
 Postage stamps and postal history of the German colonies
 New Swabia 
Ernst Thälmann Island

References

External links

 German colonies 
 WorldStatesmen

 
Germany
Col